Narayan or Narayana may refer to:

People 
Narayan (name), a common Indian name (including a list of persons with this and related names)
Narayan (actor), an Indian film actor
Narayan (writer), Indian writer
Narayana Pandit, Indian mathematician

Media and entertainment 
Narayan, a song by The Prodigy on their album The Fat of the Land
Narayan, age in the video game Myst III: Exile
Narayan, lead character of the 2005 film Water

Religion 
Narayana, a major Vedic god
 another name of the Hindu god Vishnu, who is claimed to reside in Bhavsagar on a gigantic five headed snake named Sheshnaag. Narayan is also used in the following pairs:
Nara-Narayana means human and god
 Lakshmi Narayan means Narayan and his wife, the goddess Lakshmi (goddess of wealth)

Other uses 
Narayan, Nepal in the Dailekh District

See also 
 Narayana sukta, a hymn of the Yajurveda
 Changu Narayan
 Narai, a king of Ayutthaya who was named after Narayana